Gilby may refer to:

Gilby (surname)
Gilby, North Dakota, a city in North Dakota in the United States
Gilby Engineering, motor racing team and racing car constructor